George Whelan Anderson Jr. (December 15, 1906 – March 20, 1992) was an admiral in the United States Navy and a diplomat. Serving as the Chief of Naval Operations between 1961 and 1963, he was in charge of the US blockade of Cuba during the 1962 Cuban Missile Crisis.

Early life and career
Born in Brooklyn, New York, on December 15, 1906, Anderson attended Brooklyn Preparatory School, entered the United States Naval Academy in 1923 and graduated with the class of 1927.

In World War II, Anderson served as the navigator on the fourth . He also served tours as an assistant to General Dwight Eisenhower at the North Atlantic Treaty Organization, special assistant to the Chairman of the Joint Chiefs of Staff Admiral Arthur W. Radford, and as chief of staff to the Commander in Chief Pacific.

Flag assignments
As a flag officer, Anderson commanded Task Force 77 between Taiwan and Mainland China, Carrier Division 6, in the Mediterranean during the 1958 Lebanon landing and, as a vice admiral, commanded the United States Sixth Fleet.

As Chief of Naval Operations in charge of the US quarantine of Cuba during the Cuban Missile Crisis in 1962, Anderson distinguished himself in the Navy's conduct of those operations. Time magazine featured him on the cover and called him "an aggressive blue-water sailor of unfaltering competence and uncommon flair." He had, however, a contentious relationship with Secretary of Defense Robert S. McNamara. At one point during the crisis, Anderson ordered McNamara out of the Pentagon's Flag Plot when the Secretary inquired as to the Navy's intended procedures for stopping Soviet submarines; McNamara viewed those actions as mutinous and forced Anderson to retire in 1963. Many senior naval officers had believed Anderson's next appointment would have been to Chairman of the Joint Chiefs of Staff.

Later career
Anderson took early retirement, largely because of the ongoing conflict with Secretary of Defense Robert McNamara.

President John F. Kennedy subsequently appointed Anderson Ambassador to Portugal, where he served for three years and encouraged plans for the peaceful transition of Portugal's African colonies to independence. He later returned to government service from 1973 to 1977 as member and later chairman of the President's Foreign Intelligence Advisory Board.

After his retirement from the navy, Anderson was chairman of Lamar Advertising Company, an outdoor advertising company, and he was a director on the boards of Value Line, National Airlines and Crown Seal and Cork.

Family and death
Anderson's first wife was Muriel Buttling (1911–1947). His two sons were George W. Anderson III (1935–1986), who died of brain cancer, and Thomas Patrick Anderson (1942–1978), who flew more than 200 combat missions in Vietnam.

Anderson died on March 20, 1992, of congestive heart failure, at the age of 85, in McLean, Virginia. He was survived by his second wife of 44 years, the former Mary Lee Sample (née Anderson), the widow of William Sample; a daughter; a stepdaughter; twelve grandchildren; and four great-grandchildren. He was buried on March 23, 1992, in Section 1 of Arlington National Cemetery. Muriel Buttling and both sons (George III and Thomas Patrick) are also buried at Arlington.

Cultural depictions
Anderson was portrayed by Kenneth Tobey in The Missiles of October and Madison Mason in Thirteen Days (film).

Awards
 Navy Distinguished Service Medal with gold star
 Legion of Merit
 Bronze Star Medal
 Navy Commendation Medal with "V" device
 Army Commendation Medal
 Presidential Unit Citation with bronze star
 American Defense Service Medal
 American Campaign Medal
 Asiatic-Pacific Campaign Medal with two battle stars
 World War II Victory Medal
 Navy Occupation Medal
 China Service Medal
 National Defense Service Medal with star

References

External links

 Arlington National Cemetery

|-

|-

1906 births
1992 deaths
Ambassadors of the United States to Portugal
Burials at Arlington National Cemetery
Chiefs of Naval Operations
Ford administration personnel
Laetare Medal recipients
Nixon administration personnel
People from Brooklyn
Recipients of the Legion of Merit
Recipients of the Navy Distinguished Service Medal
United States Naval Academy alumni
United States Naval Aviators
United States Navy admirals
Commanders of the Order of George I
Recipients of the Order of the Sacred Tripod
Knights of the Order of Christ (Portugal)
Recipients of the Order of Naval Merit (Brazil)
Commandeurs of the Légion d'honneur
Officers of the Order of Prince Henry
Recipients of the Military Order of Italy